The T.H. Morris House is a historic house at the southeast corner of 6th and Bethel Streets in Mammoth Spring, Arkansas.  It is a -story wood-frame American Foursquare structure, with a hip roof, and front and rear porches.  The front porch has square columns and pilasters with simple capitals, and a simple balustrade.  Built in 1908 for the owner of the local hardware store, it is the city's best example of American Foursquare architecture.

The house was listed on the National Register of Historic Places in 1990.

See also
National Register of Historic Places listings in Fulton County, Arkansas

References

Houses on the National Register of Historic Places in Arkansas
Houses in Fulton County, Arkansas
National Register of Historic Places in Fulton County, Arkansas